Athanasios Stojnović (born 17 February 2003) is a Serbian professional footballer who plays as a midfielder for Greek Super League 2 club Niki Volos.

References

2003 births
Living people
Serbian footballers
Greek footballers
Super League Greece 2 players
Football League (Greece) players
Gamma Ethniki players
Niki Volos F.C. players
Association football midfielders
Footballers from Komotini